Saat Lakh is 1957 Pakistani Urdu film directed by Jaffer Malik and produced by Saifuddin Saif. It stars Sabiha Khanum and Santosh Kumar  in the lead with supporting role by Nayyar Sultana and guest appearance by Neelo. The film is primarily known for its blockbuster music composed by Rashid Attre. It is the first successful film of Jaffer Malik.

Based on Mr. & Mrs. '55,
it is recognised one of the successful films of the 1950s with primary focus on "money" and other assets amounting to PKR700,000 of each asset including cash amounting seven lakh as described by the last will and testament. According to that last will and testament of heiress's father, his daughter is only entitled to his property if she marries. Adhering to testator's last wish, the rich heiress betrays a poor man convicted of accidental killing and starts pretending to marry him.

Plot 
A heiress has to marry in order to spend her financial assets and physical possessions worth PKR seven lakh each such as a bungalow worth PKR seven lakh and other assets also worth seven lakhs as well as cash worth PKR seven lakh. As part of this condition, she makes a plan to marry a convicted man and takes him to her home at a hill station for honeymoon where she calls her lawyer to fulfill legal requirements of marriage. Some days later, she calls the police through her lawyer for the arrest of convicted man with whom she pretended to be a true spouse. However, when he is arrested, she falls in love with him. At the time of his arrest, he learns about her betrayal behaviour and his love for heiress turns into hatred.

She subsequently tries to prove his innocence and asks the police that he accidentally killed a man who tried to rape a woman for which he was convicted and is a runaway.

Cast 
Santosh Kumar
Sabiha Khanum
Neelo
Nayyar Sultana
Agha Talish
Himalayawala
Asif Jah
Sultan Khoosat
Nighat Sultana
Nusrat Kardar

Soundtrack

Awards and nominations

References

External links 

1957 films
Pakistani black-and-white films
1950s Urdu-language films
1950s musical drama films
Pakistani romantic musical films
Films scored by Rashid Attre
Films set in Pakistan
Films shot in Pakistan
Lollywood films
1957 drama films
Nigar Award winners
Pakistani musical drama films
Urdu-language Pakistani films